Johannes Lodewyk 'Klippies' Kritzinger (1 March 1948  – 18 February 2016) was a South African rugby union player.

Playing career
As a schoolboy Kritzinger represented the Free State at the 1967 Craven Week tournament. He made his provincial debut for Natal in 1971 and also played provincial rugby for Transvaal,  the Free State, Northern Free State and Western Transvaal. Kritzinger joined the Free State in 1975 and was appointed as captain, after which he captained his team to the 1975 Currie Cup final. In 1976, although he was no longer captain, he was a member of the team that won the Currie Cup.

In 1972, Kritzinger toured with the Gazelles, a South African under–24 team, to Argentina. He played in eleven of the thirteen matches on tour and scored three tries. His first test match for the Springboks was as eighthman in the third test against the 1974 Lions at the Boet Erasmus Stadium in Port Elizabeth. He then toured with the Springboks to France at the end of 1974, playing in both test matches and in 1975 he also played in both tests against France during their return tour of South Africa. His last test match was the fourth test against the All Blacks in 1976. Kritzinger played seven tests, scoring one try and also five tour matches for South Africa.

Test history

See also
List of South Africa national rugby union players – Springbok no. 477

References

1948 births
2016 deaths
South African rugby union players
South Africa international rugby union players
Free State Cheetahs players
Golden Lions players
Sharks (Currie Cup) players
People from Harrismith
Rugby union players from the Free State (province)